Ndèye Binta Diongue (born 2 May 1988) is a Senegalese épée fencer. She competed in the 2020 Summer Olympics held in Tokyo, Japan.

References

1988 births
Living people
Senegalese female épée fencers
Olympic fencers of Senegal
Fencers at the 2020 Summer Olympics
Sportspeople from Saint-Maur-des-Fossés